Milton Clevedon is a village and civil parish  south of Evercreech in the Mendip district of Somerset, England.

History

The name of the village means the middle settlement, possibly because it is halfway between Evercreech and Bruton.

An early Iron Age earthwork, probably a stock enclosure but known as Fox Covert, occupies a spur of Creech Hill overlooking the River Alham valley. The site includes a possible barrow on the west.

In the late 12th century the manor was held under the Lovels of Castle Cary by William de Clevedon who gave the church to Bruton Abbey who held it until the dissolution of the monasteries.

The Mendip Hospital, built in 1845–47, is not near Milton Clevedon, it is located in St Cuthbert Out, near Wells.

Governance

The parish council has responsibility for local issues, including setting an annual precept (local rate) to cover the council's operating costs and producing annual accounts for public scrutiny. The parish council evaluates local planning applications and works with the local police, district council officers, and neighbourhood watch groups on matters of crime, security, and traffic. The parish council's role also includes initiating projects for the maintenance and repair of parish facilities, as well as consulting with the district council on the maintenance, repair, and improvement of highways, drainage, footpaths, public transport, and street cleaning. Conservation matters (including trees and listed buildings) and environmental issues are also the responsibility of the council.

The village falls within the Non-metropolitan district of Mendip, which was formed on 1 April 1974 under the Local Government Act 1972, having previously been part of Shepton Mallet Rural District, which is responsible for local planning and building control, local roads, council housing, environmental health, markets and fairs, refuse collection and recycling, cemeteries and crematoria, leisure services, parks, and tourism.

Somerset County Council is responsible for running the largest and most expensive local services such as education, social services, libraries, main roads, public transport, policing and fire services, trading standards, waste disposal and strategic planning.

It is also part of the Somerton and Frome county constituency represented in the House of Commons of the Parliament of the United Kingdom. It elects one Member of Parliament (MP) by the first past the post system of election.

Religious sites

The Church of St James was rebuilt in 1790 and is a Grade II* listed building.

References

External links

Villages in Mendip District
Civil parishes in Somerset